Armando Anastasio (born 24 July 1996) is an Italian professional footballer who plays as a left-back for  club Pro Vercelli, on loan from Monza.

Club career 
Grew up in the youth of Napoli, he began his football career in Padova and, the following year on loan from Napoli, to Albinoleffe. On 15 January 2019, he joined Monza on loan. On 18 July 2019, he returned to Monza on a permanent basis, signing a 4-year contract.

On 6 October 2020, Anastasio was sent on a one-year loan to Croatian side Rijeka. He was recalled from loan on 18 January 2021. On 31 August 2021, Anastasio moved to Reggiana on a one-year loan. His loan was cut short on 26 January 2022, when he was loaned out to Pordenone for the remainder of the season. On 1 September 2022, he joined Pro Vercelli on a one-year loan.

Honours
Monza
 Serie C Group A: 2019–20

References

External links
 Profile at A.C. Monza
 

1996 births
Footballers from Naples
Living people
Italian footballers
Association football fullbacks
S.S.C. Napoli players
Calcio Padova players
U.C. AlbinoLeffe players
A.C. Carpi players
Parma Calcio 1913 players
Cosenza Calcio players
A.C. Monza players
HNK Rijeka players
A.C. Reggiana 1919 players
Pordenone Calcio players
F.C. Pro Vercelli 1892 players
Serie B players
Serie C players
Croatian Football League players
Italian expatriate footballers
Italian expatriate sportspeople in Croatia
Expatriate footballers in Croatia
Italy youth international footballers